Cody Mattern (born February 23, 1981) is an American fencer. He competed in the individual and team épée events at the 2004 Summer Olympics. He coached at the Northwest Fencing Center, in Beaverton, Oregon.

Fencing
He started fencing at Northwest Fencing Center, in 1996. In 1998 and 1999, he won the Junior National Championships. In 2001 he won Division 1A, and Division 1 National Championships. He won the silver at a World Cup Grand Prix. He was an Olympic épée fencer at the 2004 Summer Olympics.
Cody was on the men's Épée team that rolled in at second place at the 2010 World Fencing Championships, in Paris. He also fenced at the 2012 World Fencing Championships Kiev, winning the Gold in men's Team Épée.

See also
List of USFA Division I National Champions

References

External links
 

1981 births
Living people
American male épée fencers
Olympic fencers of the United States
Fencers at the 2004 Summer Olympics
Sportspeople from Reno, Nevada
Sportspeople from Nevada
Pan American Games medalists in fencing
Pan American Games gold medalists for the United States
Fencers at the 2011 Pan American Games
Medalists at the 2011 Pan American Games